William Wheatcroft (by 1517 – 1558?), of Rendlesham and Ipswich, Suffolk, was an English politician.

He was a Member of Parliament (MP) for Ipswich in 1558.

References

1550s deaths
Members of the Parliament of England (pre-1707) for Ipswich
English MPs 1558
Year of birth uncertain